Kellen Damico and Nathaniel Schnugg were the defending champions but Schnugg did not compete. Damico partnered with Jonathan Eysseric but lost in the second round to Roman Jebavý and Martin Kližan.

Daniel Alejandro López and Matteo Trevisan defeated Jebavý and Kližan in the final, 7–6(7–5), 4–6, [10–8] to win the boys' doubles tennis title at the 2007 Wimbledon Championships.

Seeds

  Kellen Damico /  Jonathan Eysseric (second round)
  Greg Jones /  Brydan Klein (second round)
  Stephen Donald /  John-Patrick Smith (first round)
  Patricio Alvarado /  Fernando Romboli (first round)
  Guillermo Rivera Aránguiz /  Ricardo Urzúa-Rivera (first round)
  Thomas Fabbiano /  Andrei Karatchenia (quarterfinals)
  Daniel Alejandro López /  Matteo Trevisan (champions)
  Radu Albot /  Dragoș Cristian Mirtea (first round)

Draw

Finals

Top half

Bottom half

References

External links

Boys' Doubles
Wimbledon Championship by year – Boys' doubles